Thioredoxins are small disulfide-containing redox proteins that have been found in all the kingdoms of living organisms. Thioredoxin serves as a general protein disulfide oxidoreductase. It interacts with a broad range of proteins by a redox mechanism based on reversible oxidation of 2 cysteine thiol groups to a disulfide, accompanied by the transfer of 2 electrons and 2 protons. The net result is the covalent interconversion of a disulfide and a dithiol.

TR-S2 + NADPH + H+ -> TR-(SH)2 + NADP+ (1)

trx-S2 + TR-(SH)2 -> trx-(SH)2 + TR-S2 (2)

Protein-S2 + trx-(SH)2 -> Protein-(SH)2 + trx-S2 (3)

In the NADPH-dependent protein disulfide reduction, thioredoxin reductase (TR) catalyses reduction of oxidised thioredoxin (trx) by NADPH using FAD and its redox-active disulfide (steps 1 and 2). Reduced thioredoxin then directly reduces the disulfide in the substrate protein (step 3).

Protein disulfide isomerase (PDI), a resident foldase of the endoplasmic reticulum, is a multi-functional protein that catalyses the formation and isomerisation of disulfide bonds during protein folding. PDI contains 2 redox active domains, near the N- and C-termini, that are similar to thioredoxin: both contribute to disulfide isomerase activity, but are functionally non-equivalent. A mutant PDI, with all 4 of the active cysteines replaced by serine, displays a low but detectable level of disulfide isomerase activity. Moreover, PDI exhibits chaperone-like activity towards proteins that contain no disulfide bonds, i.e. behaving independently of its disulfide isomerase activity.

A number of endoplasmic reticulum proteins that differ from the PDI major isozyme contain 2 (ERp60, ERp5) or 3 (ERp72) thioredoxin domains; all of them seem to be PDIs. 3D-structures have been determined for a number of thioredoxins. The molecule has a doubly wound alternating alpha/beta fold, consisting of a 5-stranded parallel beta-sheet core, enclosed by 4 alpha-helices. The active site disulfide is located at the N-terminus of helix 2 in a short segment that is separated from the rest of the helix by a kink caused by a conserved proline. The 4-membered disulfide ring is located on the surface of the protein. A flat hydrophobic surface lies adjacent to the disulfide, which presumably facilitates interaction with other proteins.

One invariant feature of all thioredoxins is a cis-proline located in a loop preceding beta-strand 4. This residue is positioned in van der Waals contact with the active site cysteines and is important both for stability and function. Thioredoxin belongs to a structural family that includes glutaredoxin, glutathione peroxidase, bacterial protein disulfide isomerase DsbA, and the N-terminal domain of glutathione transferase. Thioredoxins have a beta-alpha unit preceding the motif common to all these proteins.

Human proteins containing thioredoxin domain

DNAJC10;   ERP70;     GLRX3;     P4HB;      PDIA2 (PDIP);     PDIA3;     PDIA4;
PDIA5;     PDIA6;     PDILT;      QSOX1;     QSOX2;     STRF8;     TXN;
TXN2;      TXNDC1;    TXNDC10;   TXNDC11;   TXNDC13;   TXNDC14;   TXNDC15;   TXNDC16;
TXNDC2;    TXNDC3;    TXNDC4;    TXNDC5;    TXNDC6;    TXNDC8;    TXNL1;     TXNL3;

References

Protein domains
Protein families